An obturating ring is a ring of relatively soft material designed to obturate under pressure to form a seal.  Obturating rings are often found in artillery and other ballistics applications, and similar devices are also used in other applications such as plumbing, like the olive in a compression fitting.  The term "O-ring" is sometimes used to describe this kind of pressure seal.

Ballistics uses

Obturating rings are common in artillery, where the hard steel casing of the shell is too hard to practically deform to provide a tight seal for the propellant gases.  An obturating ring or driving band made of a softer material is the typical solution.  Mortar bombs also use obturating rings to provide a seal around the projectile.  Recoilless rifles and some artillery use rings with a reverse impression of the rifling cut in them for a tighter seal even at very low pressures.

Some artillery shells use an obturating ring at the rear of the shell to provide a tight seal for the breech.  This allows a mostly caseless ammunition without the sealing issues generally encountered in such ammunition.  The obturating ring provides the sealing that would normally be provided by a cartridge case.

See also
 Broadwell ring
 Charles Ragon de Bange

References
81 mm mortar shell information, showing the obturating ring

Artillery components